Middleditch may refer to:

Thomas Middleditch (born 1982), actor and television writer.
Bernard Middleditch (1870–1949),  English footballer.
Edward Middleditch (1923–1987), artist.
Neil Middleditch (born 1957), former speedway rider and the team manager of the Poole Pirates.
Ken Middleditch (born 1925), retired speedway rider.